Collegiate Church of the Holy Cross and St. Bartholomew in Wrocław, Poland, is a two-storey brick Gothic church on the Cathedral Island.

St. Bartholomew Church
The lower church was used during several years by ethnic Germans and later by the Ukrainian Greek Catholic Church.

The Holy Cross Church
The upper church contains the epitaph of bishop Nanker.

References

External links

planergo.com
Photographs

Gothic architecture in Poland
Churches in Wrocław
Burial sites of the Opavian Přemyslids
Double churches